The Flex-Able Leftovers album, released on 10 November 1998, on Sony Records, contains five bonus tracks and is quite different from the original Flex-Able Leftovers EP. Unlike Steve Vai's other albums, which are mostly instrumental, almost all copies of Flex-Able Leftovers feature a Parental Advisory label, as a result of the song "Fuck Yourself" containing multiple profanities and sexual references. Other differences from the original version include the recording of live drums on "You Didn't Break It!" (The original used a drum machine) and the complete re-editing and mixing of the songs.

Track listing
All songs written by Steve Vai, except where noted.
"Fuck Yourself" (Listed as #?@! Yourself) (Bonus Ed. 1998) – 8:27
"So Happy" (Vai, Laurel Fishman) – 2:43
"Bledsoe Blvd" – 4:22
"Natural Born Boy" (Bonus Ed. 1998) – 3:34
"Details at 10" – 5:58
"Massacre" (Bonus Ed. 1998) – 3:25
"Burnin' Down the Mountain" – 4:22
"Little Pieces of Seaweed" – 5:12 (Vai, Larry Kutcher)
"San Sebastian" (Bonus Ed. 1998) – 1:08
"The Beast of Love" (Joe Kearney) – 3:30
"You Didn't Break it" (Bob Harris, Suzannah Harris) (1998 Version, with Robin DiMaggio (Drums)) – 4:19
"The X-Equilibrium Dance" (Bonus Ed. 1998) – 5:10
"Chronic Insomnia" – 2:00

More Information on This Edition (Discogs)

Credits

Instrumental contributions
Steve Vai – vocals, acoustic and electric guitars, coral sitar, keyboards, electric piano, bass guitar, background vocals
Mike Keneally – keyboards on "Fuck Yourself"
Tommy Mars – vocals, violin, keyboards
Stu Hamm – vocals, bass guitar
Bob Harris – background vocals
Joe Kearney – background vocals
Alex Acerra - background vocals
Larry Crane – piccolo xylophone, bell lyre, vibraphone
Robin DiMaggio – drums
Chris Frazier – drums
Deen Castronovo – drums
Pete Zeldman – percussion
Suzannah Harris – background vocals
Larry Kutcher - vocals and narration on Little Pieces of Seaweed

Technical contributions
Eddy Schreyer - mastering
Lill Vai – sound effects
Joe Despagni – sound effects

References

Steve Vai albums
1998 albums
Rock albums by American artists